The Lesotho Sky is a 6-day mountain bike stage race that takes place in the Kingdom of Lesotho. The event has been sanctioned by the Lesotho Cycling Association since 2011. It has been accredited as category 1 by the Union Cycliste Internationale (the UCI). The event first took place in 2011 covering 430 km over the 6 days. More recently the route has shortened to 340 km with a time trial through the capital of Maseru to start. The Lesotho Sky is a small event but attracts professional and amateur riders from around the world. Riders are required to ride in teams of 2 that must stay within 2 minutes of each other throughout the event. The times taken for each team to finish each day are added together and the shortest total time is the winner.

Origins

The Lesotho Sky was foundered in 2011 by Christian Schmidt and Darol Howes. The idea was conceived on a mountain bike tour across the small mountainous Kingdom of Lesotho in January 2011. Starting in the village in Morija on the west to finish going down Sani pass on the east.
Christian is from Germany but spent several years in Morija in Lesotho during his youth and knew that Lesotho had huge potential for mountain biking. After returning to Africa to study at the University of Cape Town he joined the UCT cycling club and organized the tour. His love for both Lesotho and his mountain bike are what drives the success of the event.

The first event took place in November 2011 with just 22 people, 10 of which were from Lesotho.

The Lesotho Sky is now a top bucket list stage race and as of 2015 is a Class 1 Union Cycliste Internationale stage race.

Route
The route is typically between 340 kilometres and 400 kilometres in length split over 6 days. The route starts in Lesotho's Capital Maseru at the Lesotho Sun Hotel and Casino with a 20 kilometres prologue that was introduced during the 2013 edition of the race. The following 5 days are all in rural areas of the Maseru and Mafeteng Districts of Lesotho.

History

Timeline from 2011

Winners

Men

Women

Mixed

Official charities
In 2014 Sentebale founded in 2006 by Prince Harry of the British Royal Family and Prince Seeiso of the Lesotho Royal Family became the Lesotho Sky's official event charity.

References

External links
 

Mountain biking events